{{Infobox television
|image = Colditz.jpg
|caption = Colditzs title card
|runtime = 1 Hour
|creator = Brian DegasGerard Glaister
|starring = Jack HedleyRobert WagnerDavid McCallumBernard HeptonEdward HardwickeAnthony Valentine
|country = United Kingdom
|network = BBC1
|first_aired = 
|last_aired = 
|num_series = 2
|num_episodes = 28
}}Colditz'' is a British television drama series co-produced by the BBC and Universal Studios and screened between 1972 and 1974.

The series deals with Allied prisoners of war imprisoned at the supposedly escape-proof Colditz Castle when designated Oflag IV-C during World War II, and their many attempts to escape captivity, as well as the relationships formed between the various nationalities and their German captors.

Colditz was created by Brian Degas working with the producer Gerard Glaister, who went on to devise another successful BBC series dealing with the Second World War, Secret Army. Technical consultant for the series was Major Pat Reid, the real British Escape Officer at Colditz. One of the locations used in filming was Stirling Castle.

Characters

BritishLieutenant Colonel John Preston DSO TD (Jack Hedley) – Senior British Officer, Colonel Preston is the embodiment of British stiff upper lip. He is mostly emotionless, intelligent, respected by his troops, and normally rigid in his application of principles. He gets along quite well with the accommodating Kommandant, whom he respects and is adept with in negotiating. His only real sources of passion are recollections of his time in the trenches in World War I and his wife Caroline, whom he married late and had to leave behind to go to war. During the first season he is awarded the Distinguished Service Order for his actions at Dunkirk.Captain Pat Grant (Edward Hardwicke) – Captain Grant is the first British escape officer in Colditz. He is mild-mannered and mostly level-headed. He often serves as an arbiter between his fellow officers' passion and enthusiasm and Colonel Preston's clinical calmness. The fictional Grant resembles Pat Reid, former POW who was the technical advisor for the series.Flight Lieutenant Simon Carter (David McCallum) – Flight Lieutenant Carter is a pugnacious young RAF officer who enjoys baiting the German guards and is very impatient to escape. He misses his young wife, Cathy, very much, and seeks to return to her. He finds himself frequently in solitary confinement. In the second season, he mellows a bit as he accepts the post of escape officer and is tempered by that responsibility. The fictional Carter resembles the real Colditz inmate Flight Lieutenant Dominic Bruce OBE MC AFM KSG MA, the legendary 'Medium Sized Man' from IX Squadron, who was sent to Colditz after escaping from Castle Spangenberg. Bruce was the author of one of the most celebrated of all escapes from Colditz, the so-called 'Tea Chest' escape, a replica of which was featured in the Imperial War Museum's 'Great Escapes' exhibition.Captain Tim Downing (Richard Heffer) – Captain Downing is generally the devil's advocate of the group. While he seems to be the most pessimistic of the British contingent, his criticisms are often insightful and valid. His character most closely resembles that of the Public School "Officer Class" stereotype. He is ambitious, views himself as the second-in-command, and seeks the post of escape officer. He is often at odds with Colonel Preston, whom he challenges quite frequently. He rarely participates in escape attempts himself but provides reliable support for escapees. Downing is portrayed with a handlebar moustache.Captain George Brent (Paul Chapman) – Captain Brent is the most nervous and least confident of the officers but is capable of having brilliant ideas. He is unfortunately known for the number of times he has bungled escapes or ruined others' chances at escape. He has insomnia, and often worries about the future, generally having a pessimistic outlook on his captivity. However, he has occasionally been extraordinarily brave, such as in the episode "Ghosts" where he remained holed up in dreadful conditions, voluntarily, for several weeks. An accomplished artist, Brent uses his skilfulness to sketch a likeness of a refuse collector in the episode "Court Martial" in order to aid and abet an escape attempt by Flight Lieutenant Carrington. He has a weakness for gambling, and at one time lost his house, home to his infirm father, having involved himself in a card school with a notorious card sharp, Flight Lieutenant Collins. Brent is usually portrayed wearing a cricket sweater like the real life Rupert BarryLieutenant Dick Player RN (Christopher Neame) – Lieutenant Player is a quiet but determined officer from the Royal Navy. His perfect German and history of living in Germany cause the Germans to suspect he is a spy at first, which causes him a great deal of trouble. Once in Colditz, though, he is a keen and cool escaper, and participates in some of the most daring and fantastic escape attempts of the series.Pilot Officer Peter Muir (Peter Penry-Jones) – P.O. Muir is a rash officer who has a reputation for not looking before he leaps. Nevertheless, he is a keen member of the escape team. He formed part of Pat Grant's escape team, but was wounded by a gunshot when he and Player were recaptured.Lieutenant Jordan (Padre) (Donald McDonald) – The Padre is a mild-mannered officer who, in his own words, does "not exactly summon a multitude" with his tedious sermons. His cloth unfortunately often conflicts with his duty to the war effort, and so Colonel Preston generally keeps him out of any escape plans. At one point he protests this with a quotation from 1 Corinthians, "When I became a man I put away childish things". Patrick Troughton played "Padre" in one episode of the first season.Doc (Geoffrey Palmer) – The Doc is featured in three episodes, most prominently in "Tweedledum". He is frustrated by the lack of medicines and views the German village doctor as a quack.Wing Commander George Marsh (Michael Bryant) – A medical orderly and assistant to the British Medical Officer, Marsh is the officer who famously feigned insanity to achieve repatriation.Lieutenant Page (Ian McCulloch) – Lieutenant Page is an antisocial and violent late addition to the British contingent, who appears to have little knowledge of the air force, despite claiming to be an air force officer. Page is not his real name but the identity of the Lysander pilot who was killed while inserting him into France. This character is a British Secret agent on his thirteenth mission and is known to, and being hunted by, the Gestapo. Suffering from post-traumatic stress disorder he sees his identity change as a chance to escape the war and hide out in Colditz, the last place the Gestapo would look for him. Flying Officer Jimmy Walker (Peter Winter) – An RAF officer who suspects Lieutenant Page is a German spy, picks a fight with him and as a result ends up with injury to his eyes.Captain George Holland (David Allister) – A member of the escape committee who becomes unstable as he gives up hope from escaping the castle.Lance Corporal Baker (Alec Wallis) – Colonel Preston's personal NCO who has immense respect for his superior.Lieutenant Michael Brown (Sean Roantree) -Captain Walters (Nicholas McArdle) -Corporal Hopkins (Len Lowe) -Squadron Leader Tony Shaw (Jeremy Kemp) – An aerial reconnaissance pilot and one of the most highly decorated men in the Allied Forces. In addition to which, according to Hauptmann Ulmann, Shaw is also the most decorated person in Colditz, apart from Major Mohn. An academic lecturer before the war, he becomes obsessed with his idea of an escape using a POW built glider. The real Colditz Cock glider was devised and built by RAF pilot, Bill Goldfinch with Jack Best his partner in the construction.Major Trumpington (Willie Rushton) – A Scottish Commando, captured with two companions during a raid on Boulogne. The German SD intend to implement Hitler's order that all Commandos are to be shot. Despite the best efforts of the SBO, the British escape committee and the Camp Kommandant, Major Trumpington and his two fellow commandos are taken away by the SD for execution but are shot while trying to escape. This episode mirrors the fate of the Operation Musketoon commandos who were briefly imprisoned in the solitary confinement cells at Colditz before being shot at Sachsenhausen. Flt Lt Bruce's conversation with the commando leader Capt Black is retold in "Operation Musketoon" by Stephen Schofield.Flight Lieutenant Jack Collins (Ray Barrett) – A late and disruptive arrival who introduces a card school into the British quarters. Captain George Brent joins the school and eventually loses very heavily. Owing £1000, Brent loses his house in a game of 'double or quit'. Collins attempts escape by playing cards with Unterfeldwebel Ernst Krueger, a German quartermaster, cheating to make Krueger lose heavily before bribing him for a workers identity disc. The escape attempt is foiled and Collins is moved out of Colditz but not before the Kommandant retrieves and returns all Brent's losses to the SBO.Lieutenant McDonald (Prentis Hancock). McDonald is portrayed as having a working-class background unlike the private schooled other officers. He is a Scottish commando who receives a letter from his wife informing him she is pregnant by another man. He resolves to escape soon and after initial debating and resistance, is given a place on a French escape plan. He escapes the castle wall and encourages the French escapee to press on without him. Seemingly with a deathwish, McDonald is shot in the wire. The Kommandant reads unposted letters of McDonald's indicating McDonald indeed wanted to die in the escape. McDonald's character has some resemblances to the real life Michael Sinclair. McDonald has red hair as did Sinclair who was nicknamed 'The Red Fox'. Sinclair was the only person killed while escaping from Colditz. However, the nature of Sinclair's fatal escape attempt was very different from that portrayed by McDonald.Lieutenant James Porteous (Jim Norton) – The Colditz Librarian. Although having made two previous escape attempts whilst in transit, having been confined to Colditz Porteous becomes a somewhat staid and unenthusiastic escaper who appears to be happy to sit out the war. A schoolmaster before the war, Porteous strikes up a friendship with the equally (initially) reticent Sqn Ldr Tony Shaw.Cathy Carter (Joanna David) – While not an internee, Carter's wife plays a decent-sized role in the series. Reluctant to let her new husband leave in the second episode, she is devastated to learn he has been shot down and worries that he has not survived. When she learns he is at a POW camp, she keeps in touch with him through letters. Good at crosswords and quick on the uptake, Cathy becomes embroiled in a scheme to connect escaping prisoners with the European underground. In this, she resembles Mary Lagan Bruce (the real-life wife of the 'Medium Sized Man' Dominic Bruce), who once sent her husband a silk escaping map (of Northern Germany) supplied to her by MI9 and concealed in the brass button of a uniform she sent him. This map was featured in the Imperial War Museum 'Great Escapes' exhibition and was subsequently donated to the museum of IX Squadron, RAF Marham, by their son, Brendan Bruce.

AmericanFlight Lieutenant Phil Carrington (Robert Wagner) – Flight Lieutenant Carrington is an American officer who volunteered to serve with the British early in the war. As per the real life Micky Burn, he served as a journalist in Berlin before the war and has an intimate knowledge of Germany and German politics, admits to having had some admiration for National Socialism. Carrington appears to be sensible at first, but he is a maverick, which gets him in trouble with the Germans and the British alike. Carrington becomes involved in an escape attempt with Pat Grant, the character based on real life escapee Pat Reid. In reality the officer who escaped with Reid via Hans Larive's Singen route was Canadian Howard Wardle. In later episodes, Carrington is shown to have switched his commission to the US Army Air Corps as a Major, and, in that role, is recaptured and sent to Colditz along with the three characters listed below.Lieutenant Jim Phipps (Garrick Hagon) – US POW who becomes the central element of an episode when the Germans categorise him as 'Prominente' on the basis of being the son of a US Ambassador. In reality Lieutenant John Winant Jr., was the son of John Gilbert Winant, US ambassador to Britain.Lieutenant Colonel Max Dodd (Dan O'Herlihy) – Old-school and brash, Colonel Dodd arrives with Major Carrington on his second trip to Colditz, and rapidly becomes the Senior American Officer of that growing contingent. He does not take well to being a prisoner, and often clashes with the Kommandant. Unlike his counterpart Colonel Preston, he is more than willing to take substantial risks with his men in order to accomplish his objectives. In reality the Colonel among the three paratroopers captured in Hungary and sent to Colditz was Colonel Florimund Duke – the oldest American paratrooper of the war.Captain Harry Nugent (Al Mancini) – arrives with Dodd and the return of Carrington. In reality the two real life paratroops arriving with Florimund Duke in August 1944 were Captain Guy Nunn, and Alfred Suarez.Lieutenant Colonel Harrity (Ed Bishop) – Commander of the American troops who liberate the castle in the final episode. He offers Preston the chance to get some "justice", but Preston will have none of it and insists on proper treatment for the Germans.

FrenchCapitaine André Vaillant (Gerard Paquis) – Capitaine Vaillant is a stereotypical riviera Frenchman who is self-serving, self-righteous, dashing, and a shameless womaniser.Capitaine Henri Lefevre (Henri Szeps) -Capitaine Duprez (Guido Adorni) -Lieutenant Maurice Tailière (Boyd Mackenzie) -Lieutenant Beausire  (Stuart Fell)

 German 
Oflag IV-CKommandant (Bernard Hepton) – The Kommandant, known only by his forename "Karl", is a moderate and honourable Oberst (Colonel) of the Wehrmacht. He holds to the old Army ways of respecting enemy officers and adheres to the Geneva Convention to the best of his ability. He has difficulty believing that any authority but the OKW is legitimate, and often finds himself in dilemmas over orders he gets from the Waffen-SS or Reich Security. Fortunately, he has an ally in General Schaetzel, a respected figure in the OKW. With the help of Schaetzel, and Colonel Preston's cooperation, he constantly works to prevent the SS from taking control of the camp. He finds it boring in the camp and can't stand incompetence. When important visitors come round he is usually embarrassed by one prisoner or another. He is aware the British Officers get very restless and hot-headed, but he relies on Colonel Preston to keep them in check. When they do try something he tries to have a shout at Preston, only to find that Preston is made of stern stuff, hardly flinching when he is shouted at and always keeping a straight face; this annoys the Kommandant even more, but he knows there is nothing he can do. He has a young son, Erich, in the Luftwaffe and a wife named Lisa. He worries about Erich, he himself has seen war and fears for his son's safety and that he won't become blood thirsty. He just wishes that everything will run smoothly so that he can get on with his life, and that his son will return home. He is shaken and broken when he learns that his son died ignominiously, crushed by a Russian tank.Hauptmann Franz Ulmann (Hans Meyer) – Hauptmann Ulmann is the Security Officer at Colditz. A calculating and rather robotic individual most of the time, he takes his job of preventing escapes seriously and is sometimes ill at ease with the Kommandant's lax attitude. He took over early from Oberleutnant Lehr, a young and easygoing officer who was drafted to the front lines and was appalled at the lack of discipline among the security forces. Because of his careful planning and sharp eyes and mind, he is able to avert many escape attempts as well as many attempts of the SS to take over the camp. He seems to have been sent by the OKW specifically to help the Kommandant in these matters. While occasionally he comes up with a brilliant scheme, most of his captures are a result of thoroughness. He develops a warm relationship with Carrington over the course of the series. He believes there is no such thing as an escape-proof prison, but he plans to make security such that the prisoners will struggle anyway. Like the Kommandant, he is a Wehrmacht man who has no love of the SS. Ulmann is largely based on real life Reinhold Eggers who later wrote a book presenting the German side of the story. Eggers' book contains a foreword by a former Dutch POW, Damiaen Joan van Doorninck, who commented, "This man was our opponent, but nevertheless he earned our respect by his correct attitude, self-control and total lack of rancour despite all the harassment we gave him."Major Horst Mohn (Anthony Valentine) – Mohn is a character who joins at the start of the second series and is likely based on Major Amthor, the real-world second in command officer at Colditz from May 1943. A Luftwaffe paratrooper hero with the Knight's Cross of the Iron Cross with Oak Leaves (though the medal shown in the series is the Knight's Cross of the Iron Cross with Oak Leaves and Swords), and German Cross in Gold, Major Mohn was severely wounded at Stalingrad by a Russian bayonet and served on Hitler's personal staff before coming to Colditz. He is a Nazi Party member in good standing, and very highly connected (although the series does not mention to whom). He constantly finds himself in conflict with the Kommandant, for he holds the philosophy that the war is still going on at Colditz and is frustrated by what he perceives as the treating of prisoners with "kid gloves". The prisoners loathe him and do whatever they can to foil him or antagonise him at every turn. Unfortunately for them, he is ruthlessly intelligent and occasionally pulls off a devastating capture. Major Mohn is a paratroop officer and his relationship with the SS appears to be fairly chilly. He is visibly upset with the SD orders given at the end of the episode "The Guests" and seems nervous around the Obergruppenführer and Hauptsturmführer in "Very Important Person." It appears that the reason why Major Mohn would prefer to take SS orders unquestioningly than risk SS reprisals is that he appreciates, apparently better than the Kommandant, what the SS is capable of. In contrast to the honourable Kommandant and Ulmann, Mohn is a sinister and villainous character. Oberleutnant Anton Lehr (Grahame Mallard) – Lieutenant Lehr is the first Security Officer of Colditz, but in the fourth episode is posted to the front. He is easygoing and cheerful most of the time, although he gets the job done with apparent competence. He is not upset at the posting and looks forward to fighting for his country. In reality Paul Priem was the first Security Officer. Pat Reid described Priem as, "the only German with a sense of humour".Major Willi Schaeffer (Michael Gough) – Major Schaeffer is second in command and a friend of the Kommandant. He does not approve of the war. He clashes with Ullmann over his alcohol consumption, and Ullmann warns the Kommandant that his behaviour could cause the SS to take over the camp.Oberstabsarzt Dr. Starb (Kenneth Griffith) – A very stuffy Major (Oberstabsarzt) who serves briefly on the camp medical staff. He is irritated at the relaxed discipline of the British and decides to enforce saluting. He is a small, short-tempered man who likes to feel superior. He finds many things irritating and the smallest thing can make him angry. He feels that the prisoners and staff at Colditz are lazy and thick. When he gets Carter court-martialled for failing to salute, the Kommandant has him removed for fear of prisoner reprisals. Dr. Starb was apparently based on a real doctor who served in Colditz and had a prisoner court-martialed for failing to salute.
 Unterfeldwebel Ernst Krueger (Leonard Fenton) – The canteen sergeant, has a strong propensity for playing card games in particular three card brag. Involves himself in playing cards with notorious card sharp Flt Lt Jack Collins which consequently results in him compromising his position. Is caught aiding and abetting a planned escape by Collins as a repayment for his losses in the card school and is subsequently transferred to the military prison at Leipzig to await court martial. A popular character with the other members of the garrison, Krueger is found guilty and subsequently shot by a firing squad which results in antagonism between the German guards and certain British prisoners, particularly Collins.
 Unterfeldwebel Blatau (Roy Pattison) – An administrative clerk for Hauptmann Ulmann, Blatau prepares the briefing papers which Ulmann uses to thwart an SS takeover of Colditz.
 Unteroffizier Henneberg (Gertan Klauber) – A camp guard who professes religious piety by handing out Bibles to prisoners. Henneberg's outward persona disguises his true nature as a thief and bully. Henneberg begins to steal items from the prisoner's Red Cross parcels, and his behavior results in him being murdered by Captain Alan Marshall. Aware of the actions of Henneberg, the Kommandant decides to disguise his murder as suicide in order to convince the Gestapo that there was no breach of order or discipline inside Colditz. The Kommandant explains the suicide of Henneberg as a consequence of him becoming melancholy upon receiving news that his (Henneberg's) son, a serving soldier in the Wehrmacht, had been killed in action on the Eastern Front.

Oflag VII-CKommandant (Michael Sheard) – Kommandant of Oflag VII-C. Oberst (Colonel) Reichtleig an archetypal German officer, who does all he can to intimidate the newly arrived British prisoners; pointing out the futility of any attempts to escape.

GestapoBrauner (Peter Barkworth) – A chief plain-clothes Gestapo officer of unknown rank (likely to be a Kriminalrat), Brauner is the stereotype of the sinister police organisation. He is intentionally intimidating with his precision and cold curiosity. He is not afraid to torture uncooperative subjects of his interrogations, as Phil Carrington discovers the hard way.Sturmbannführer (Nigel Stock) and Hauptsturmführer (Terrence Hardiman) – The "Good Cop, Bad Cop" Gestapo team who attempt to determine Player's identity when one of their agents captures him. They seem complete opposites, an angry, loud-mouthed pompous grumpy old man and a calm, helpful, kind vegetarian. But in private, it is revealed, they are just as bad as each other: sly, sneaky and cruel.

SSObergruppenführer Berger (David King) – Obergruppenführer Gottlob Berger was the real-life SS commander who took over the Leipzig/Colditz area late in the war and was in charge of the removal of the Prominente from Colditz. He is portrayed in the series as a boisterous but unyielding individual for whom everyone holds a measure of fear, even Major Mohn.Hauptsturmführer Schankel (John Pennington) – Schankel is a yes-man who puts up with the patronising attitude of his superior officer with a smile.

MiscellaneousBaumann (Ralph Michael) – The civilian lawyer, sympathetic to prisoners and intent on imposing the letter of German law, who agrees to take Carter's case against Dr. Starb.Leutnant Erich (Martin Howells) – Erich, the son of the Kommandant, is a Luftwaffe officer in his early twenties. He is anxious to fly for the Luftwaffe, despite the deep concern of his father and mother. Much of the angst of the series centres on the Kommandant's worry that he will not return home.Paul Graf von Eissinger (John Quentin) – Count Von Eissinger is a contact of Player's father, who was a diplomat in Germany before the war. He is apparently wealthy and well-connected. He broke his back years ago when his horse fell on him. He had it shot dead. He regretted this later, because due to his broken back (which would not mend) he did not have to go to war. Although he is willing to help identify Player, he has the ulterior motive of using Player in a conspiracy to overthrow Hitler. Player turns this down and is sent to the PoW camp.Gerda''' (Sarah Craze) – Gerda is the young German organist at the Colditz town church. She falls for the dashing Capitaine Vaillant and helps him to escape, feeling for him as she does for her brother who is a POW in Russia.

Episodes

Series 1

Series 2

Historical accuracy
Many of the events depicted in the series are based on fact. Exceptions for dramatic purposes include the mentions of the Kommandant's son, Colonel Preston's wife and mother, and the completely fictional Major Mohn, who appears in series two. While there is not a direct one-to-one relationship between the real and televised characters, most of the televised characters are loosely based on one or several actual persons. The most obvious are Pat Grant (Pat Reid) and Hauptmann Ulmann (Reinhold Eggers).

No mention was made in the series of Squadron Leader/Group Captain Douglas Bader, the real-life RAF pilot who lost both legs in a plane crash before the war and ended up in Colditz after various escape attempts from other camps. He remained imprisoned until the liberation.

DVD release
A 10-disc Region 2 Box Set DVD of the complete series was released on 15 November 2010 including bonus mock up cards of camp propaganda materials and a stapled character booklet.

References

External links 
 British Film Institute Screen Online
 Colditz at the Television Heaven website
 
 

BBC television dramas
Colditz Castle
World War II television drama series
Television series based on actual events
Television series by Universal Television
1972 British television series debuts
1974 British television series endings
English-language television shows
1970s British drama television series
British prison television series
Television series set in 1940
Television series set in 1941
Television series set in 1942
Television series set in 1943
Television series set in 1944
Television series set in 1945